Omega Geminorum, Latinized from ω Geminorum, is a star located in the middle of the northern zodiac constellation of Gemini. With an apparent visual magnitude of 5.18, it is faintly visible to the naked eye. According to the Bortle scale, it can be viewed from dark suburban skies. With an annual parallax shift of just 2.19 mas, it is located about 1,500 light years from the Sun.

This is an evolved bright giant star with a stellar classification of G5 II. It is positioned near the instability strip and in 1977 was listed as a candidate cepheid variable star with a luminosity amplitude of 0.086 and a period of 0.7282 days. At its estimated distance, this yields a physical size of about 72 times the radius of the Sun. It has 6.3 times the mass of the Sun and radiates 1,813 times the solar luminosity from its outer atmosphere at an effective temperature of 5,090 K.

References

External links

G-type bright giants
Gemini (constellation)
Geminorum, Omega
Durchmusterung objects
052497
033927
02630
Geminorum, 42
Suspected variables